The 2016 Wisconsin Fall General Election was held in the U.S. state of Wisconsin on November 8, 2016. One of Wisconsin's U.S. Senate seats and all eight seats in the United States House of Representatives are up for election, as well as half of the Wisconsin Senate seats and all of the Wisconsin Assembly seats. The 2016 Fall Partisan Primary was held on August 9, 2016.

The Wisconsin Republican Party made large gains in the 2016 election. Businessman and Republican presidential nominee Donald Trump won Wisconsin in an upset, becoming the first Republican to win the state since 1984. Additionally, the state GOP had a strong showing in the State Legislature, building their largest majorities since 1957, and Republican Senator Ron Johnson defeated Russ Feingold a second time for a second term. This put Walker and the Wisconsin GOP in a strong position.

Wisconsin Republicans also celebrated the victory of Justice Rebecca Bradley in the April election for Wisconsin Supreme Court.  Bradley had been appointed to the court in 2015 after the death of Justice N. Patrick Crooks, who had been seen as a swing vote on the court.

Federal

President

Senate

In a rematch of the 2010 election, first term incumbent Republican Ron Johnson ran against former Democratic U.S. Senator Russ Feingold. Johnson defeated Feingold in the general election with 50.2% of the vote.

House of Representatives

All of Wisconsin's eight United States House of Representatives seats were up for election in 2016. Party composition remained unchanged after the general election.

State

Legislature

State Senate

The 16 even-numbered districts out of 33 seats in the Wisconsin Senate were up for election in 2016. Nine of these seats were held by Republicans and seven were held by Democrats. Prior to the election, Republicans controlled the chamber with a 19 to 14 majority, but they gained a seat in the election.

State Assembly

All 99 seats of the Wisconsin State Assembly were up for election in November. Nine Assemblymen (6 Republicans, 3 Democrats) did not seek re-election.

Judiciary

State Supreme Court

Incumbent Wisconsin Supreme Court Justice Rebecca Bradley defeated Judge JoAnne Kloppenburg of the Wisconsin Court of Appeals in the April general election.  Justice Bradley had been appointed to the court in 2015 by Governor Scott Walker, to replace Justice N. Patrick Crooks, who had died in office.  Justice Crooks' term was already set to expire in 2016, thus no special election needed to be scheduled.

Though Wisconsin judicial elections are nonpartisan, Justice Bradley's victory was seen as an important win for the Republican party, as she claims a judicial philosophy aligned with conservative judges like Samuel Alito and Clarence Thomas, and she had been endorsed by Republican-aligned interest groups such as the National Rifle Association and Wisconsin Right to Life.  Justice Crooks, who she was replacing, was seen as a swing vote on the court, so this was a net gain for the conservative bloc on the court.

Candidates
Rebecca Bradley, incumbent Justice of the Wisconsin Supreme Court
M. Joseph Donald, Milwaukee County circuit judge
JoAnne Kloppenburg, judge of the Wisconsin Court of Appeals District IV division

Results

State Court of Appeals
All four districts of the Wisconsin Court of Appeals had a seat up for election in 2016.  None of the races were contested.
 In District I, Judge Joan F. Kessler was elected to her third term without opposition.
 In District II, Judge Paul F. Reilly was elected to his second term without opposition.
 In District III, Judge Thomas Hruz was elected to his first full term, after being appointed to the court by Governor Scott Walker in 2014.
 In District IV, Judge Brian Blanchard was elected to his second term without opposition.

State Circuit Courts
Forty of the state's 249 circuit court seats were up for election in 2020.  Ten of those seats were contested.  Three incumbent judges were defeated—Milwaukee County judges Paul Rifelj and Michelle Ackerman Havas, and Eau Claire County judge Brian H. Wright.  All three defeated judges had been appointed by Governor Scott Walker.

Local

Kenosha
 John Antaramian was elected to a four-year term as Mayor of Kenosha.  He was returning to office after having previously served four four-year terms as Mayor from 1992 through 2008.

Milwaukee
 Incumbent Tom Barrett was reelected to his fourth term as Mayor of Milwaukee, defeating alderman Bob Donovan.
 Incumbent County Executive Chris Abele was re-elected, defeating state senator Chris Larson.

References

 
Wisconsin